American actor Don Cheadle has received multiple accolades for his film, television and stage performances. His major nominations include an Academy Award,  two British Academy Film Awards, three  Grammy Awards, six Golden Globe Awards, eleven Primetime Emmy Awards, ten Screen Actors Guild Awards, and a Tony Award out of which he has won two Golden Globes, two Grammys, two Screen Actors Guild Awards and a Tony Award.

Major associations

Academy Awards

British Academy Film Awards

The British Academy Britannia Awards

Golden Globe Awards

Grammy Awards

Independent Spirit Award

Primetime Emmy Awards

Screen Actors Guild Awards

Tony Awards

Other awards and nominations

AARP Movies for Grownups Awards

Audie Awards

Awards Circuit Community Awards

BET Awards

Black Reel Awards

Black Reel Awards for Television

Blockbuster Entertainment Awards

Critics' Choice Television Awards

Christopher Award

Gotham Awards

Hollywood Film Awards

MTV Movie & TV Awards

Nickelodeon Kids' Choice Awards

NAACP Image Awards

People's Choice Awards

Satellite Awards

Scream Awards

ShoWest Convention

Teen Choice Awards

Festivals & Guilds

Berlin International Film Festival

Cleveland International Film Festival

Glasgow Film Festival

Los Angeles Film Festival

Palm Springs International Film Festival

Critics associations

See also
 List of Don Cheadle performances

References

External links
 

Lists of awards received by American actor